Ngubi (Ngove) is a minor Bantu language of Gabon.

References

Sira languages
Languages of Gabon